Ambedkar Nagar Hospital is a public hospital in Ambedkar Nagar assembly constituency, Delhi. The foundation stone was laid in 2013 by Union Minister for Health and Family Welfare Ghulam Nabi Azad and the Chief Minister of Delhi Sheila Dikshit. In 2020, on 9 August, the Chief Minister of Delhi Arvind Kejriwal inaugurated the hospital.

In August 2020, the 200-bedded COVID Unit with Oxygen facility was inaugurated. The Hospital is being built as a 600-bedded multi-specialty hospital in South East District of Delhi.

References 

Hospitals in Delhi
Hospitals established in 2020
2020 establishments in Delhi